The Lowell Formation is a geologic formation in Arizona. It preserves fossils dating back to the Cretaceous period.

See also 
 List of fossiliferous stratigraphic units in Arizona
 Paleontology in Arizona

References 

Geologic formations of Arizona
Cretaceous Arizona
Aptian Stage
Paleontology in Arizona